Victoria Camps (born 1941, Barcelona) is a Spanish philosopher and professor of ethics.

Career
She obtained a degree in philosophy at the University of Barcelona, completing her thesis, entitled “La dimensión pragmática del lenguaje”, in 1975.

She has been the vice-rector, lecturer and full professor of ethics at the Autonomous University of Barcelona. She has participated in the bioethics committees of the Hospital del mar and of the Hospital de la Vall d’Hebron.

Between 1993 and 1996 she was a senator for the Socialists' Party of Catalonia.

She is currently a member of the Bioethics Committee of Spain and collaborates in journals such as “Isegoría” and “Letra internacional”. As a philosopher, she is deemed a very influential author and one of the main inheritors of the thought of philosophers José Luis Aranguren and José Luis Ferrater Mora.

Her work and ideas cover a vast arrays of topics, from pragmatics to theology, and from the exclusion of women from work to ideals of well-being and citizenship in the modern state, together with ethics in communication and in public representation.

Awards
In 2008 she became the 22nd recipient of the Menéndez Pelayo International Prize.

Bibliography 

 Los teólogos de la muerte de Dios, 1968.
 Pragmática del lenguaje y filosofía analítica, 1976.
 La imaginación ética, 1983;
 Ética, retórica y política, 1983.
 Virtudes públicas 1990.
 Paradojas del individualismo, 1993.
 Los valores de la educación, 1994.
 El malestar de la vida pública, 1994.
 El siglo de las mujeres, 1998.
 Manual de civismo 1998.
 Qué hay que enseñar a los hijos, 2000.
 Una vida de calidad: reflexiones sobre bioética, 2002.
 La voluntad de vivir, 2005.
 Hablemos de Dios 2007 written in collaboration with Amelia Valcarcel
 Creer en la educación, 2008.
 El gobierno de las emociones, 2011.
 Breve historia de la ética, 2013.

References

Philosophers from Catalonia
1941 births
Living people
Spanish women philosophers
Spanish ethicists
20th-century Spanish philosophers
21st-century Spanish philosophers
Academic staff of the Autonomous University of Barcelona
University of Barcelona alumni
20th-century Spanish women